Setiabudi is a district in South Jakarta, one of the five administrative cities which forms the Jakarta Capital Region, Indonesia. It is in the Golden Triangle of Jakarta of business and commercial establishments in Jakarta.

It is named after an Indonesian hero of partial Indo and Sundanese descent, Ernest Douwes Dekker, also known as Danudirdja Setiabudi (died 1950).

About half of its boundaries are with Central Jakarta.

Setiabudi residential neighborhood
Setiabudi administrative village (12910) was among the first Jakartan housing neighborhoods set out by the independent nation. It is the oldest such place in the District and contains the oldest buildings standing. It was among the first two neighborhoods with direct access to the Sudirman Road, the other being Bendungan Hilir.

Planning was initiated in the 1950s but mostly completed in the 1960s. The work heralded the building of the Kuningan Road.

Kelurahan (Administrative Village)
Setiabudi District is divided into eight kelurahan or administrative villages:

Boundaries
It is bounded by Cideng River, Menteng Pulo Road, a water channel to the east, a flood channel to the north, Jalan Jenderal Sudirman (a main road to the west), and Jalan Jenderal Gatot Subroto (a main road to the south).

List of important places

The 2003 JW Marriott hotel bombing, the 2004 Australian embassy bombing in Jakarta, and the 2009 JW Marriott - Ritz-Carlton bombings occurred within Mega Kuningan.
Rasuna Epicentrum is a area filled with high-rise buildings with a total area of 53.6 hectares, consisting of residential, offices, hotels, hospitals, places of worship, sports, shopping and entertainment and education all in one area.
Pasar Rumput Market

Manggarai Bus Terminal
Manggarai Bus Terminal, which opened on 16 April 2014, is integrated with TransJakarta corridor and KRL Jabodetabek Commuter Line with skywalk.

References

Districts of Jakarta
Central business districts in Indonesia
South Jakarta